Alvarezsauridae is a family of small, long-legged dinosaurs. Although originally thought to represent the earliest known flightless birds, they are now thought to be an early diverging branch of maniraptoran theropods. Alvarezsaurids were highly specialized. They had tiny but stout forelimbs, with compact, bird-like hands. Their skeletons suggest that they had massive breast and arm muscles, possibly adapted for digging or tearing. They had long, tube-shaped snouts filled with tiny teeth. They have been interpreted as myrmecophagous, adapted to prey on colonial insects such as termites, with the short arms acting as effective digging instruments to break into nests. 

Alvarezsaurus, the type genus of the family, was named for the historian Gregorio Álvarez.

History of study
Bonaparte (1991) described the first alvarezsaurid, Alvarezsaurus calvoi, from an incomplete skeleton found in Patagonia, Argentina. Bonaparte also named a family, Alvarezsauridae, to contain it. He argued that Alvarezsaurus might be most closely related to the ornithomimosaurs.

In 1993, Perle et al. described the next alvarezsaur to be discovered, naming it Mononychus olecranus (meaning "one claw"). A month later they changed the genus name to Mononykus, because the earlier spelling was already the genus name of an extant beetle. Perle et al. mistakenly described Mononykus as a member of Avialae, one more advanced than Archaeopteryx. They argued that the family Alvarezsauridae was actually a group of Mesozoic flightless birds on the basis of several features that were supposedly unique to birds.

In 1996, Novas described another member of the group called Patagonykus puertai. Karhu and Rautian (1996) described a Mongolian member of the family; Parvicursor remotus. Chiappe et al.(1998) described another Mongolian member, Shuvuuia deserti, and found it to be a bird as in Perle et al.'s analysis.

 
These mistaken assignments of alvarezsaurids to birds were caused primarily by features that are strikingly, or even uniquely, avian. The sternum, for example, is elongated and deeply keeled for an enlarged pectoralis muscle, as it is in neognathous birds and volant ratites. One bone in the skull of Shuvuuia appeared to be an ectethmoid fused to a prefrontal. The ectethmoid is an ossification known only in Neornithes. Other birdlike characters included the palatine, foramen magnum, cervical and caudal vertebrae, and many others.

Several researchers disagreed with Perle et al. (1993) and Chiappe et al. (1998), Feduccia (1994), Ostrom (1994), Wellnhofer (1994), Kurochkin (1995), Zhou (1995), and Sereno (1997) considered it unlikely that alvarezsaurids were members of Avialae. Martin (1997) performed a cladistic analysis  but Sereno criticized it strongly, finding it flawed by incorrect codings, use of only select data, and results that did not support his conclusions. Sereno (1999) performed a new analysis, revising the anatomical interpretations and clarifying the characters. He found that alvarezsaurids were more parsimoniously related to the Ornithomimosauria.

As the more primitive members of the Alvarezsauridae were better characterized, the monophyly of the clade was strongly supported, but the more primitive members lacked the most birdlike traits. Some of these traits had been misinterpreted, also. The remaining similarities between birds and alvarezsaurs, like the keeled sterna, are another case of homoplasy; where the derived alvarezsaurids developed birdlike characters  through convergent evolution, rather than inheriting them from a common ancestor with birds.

Description

Fossils attributed to alvarezsaurids have also been found in North and South America and Asia, and range in age from about 86 to 66 million years ago.

Feathers
At least one specimen of alvarezsaurid, from the species Shuvuuia deserti, preserved down-like, feathery, integumental structures covering the fossil. Schweitzer et al. (1999) subjected these filaments to microscopic, morphological, mass spectrometric, and immunohistochemical studies and found that they consisted of beta-keratin, which is the primary protein in feathers.

Lifestyle
The lifestyle of alvarezsaurids has been debated since the nature of these dinosaurs was established. It has been suggested by numerous palaeontologists that they used their claws to break into ant and termite colonies, though the arm anatomy of an alvarezsaurid would require the animal to lie on its chest against a termite nest. It is also possible that the alvarezsaurids filled some ecological niche that has not yet been considered. Studies of the tails in various alvarezsaur genera also suggest they were possessed of an incredible ability to change their rotational inertia, and combined with their forelimbs, this suggests their ecological niches were similar to those of aardvarks, pangolins, and anteaters.

Additionally, it is known that alvarezsaurids, with their long legs, appear to be built for speed. What implications this has on possible lifestyle is unknown. The discovery of Qiupanykus in association with oviraptorid eggs, indicates that the advanced alvarezsaurids may also have been specialists in nest raiding, using their robust thumb claws to crack open eggshells.

Classification 

Turner et al. (2007) place the alvarezsaurs as the most basal group in the Maniraptora, one step more derived than Ornitholestes and two more derived than the Ornithomimosauria. The alvarezsaurs are more primitive than the Oviraptorosauria.

Novas' 1996 description of Patagonykus, demonstrated that it was a link between the more primitive (basal) Alvarezsaurus and the more advanced (derived) Mononykus, and reinforced their monophyly. Parvicursor was discovered shortly after, and placed in its own family Parvicursoridae, and then Shuvuuia in 1998. Everything has since been lumped into Alvarezsauridae, with Mononykinae surviving as a subfamily.

There may be a relationship between the alvarezsaurids and the Ornithomimosauria as sister clades within either Thomas Holtz's Arctometatarsalia or Paul Sereno's Ornithomimiformes. The discovery of Haplocheirus, which exhibits transitional features between the more derived alvarezsaurs and other maniraptorans, particularly in relation to the skull structure and development of the hand, has provided further support for that relationship.

The taxonomy of the alvarezsaurs has been somewhat confused, due to different authors using different names for groups with the same definition. The family Alvarezsauridae was first coined by Jose Bonaparte in 1991, but given no specific phylogenetic definition. Novas later defined the group as the most recent common ancestor of Alvarezsaurus and Mononykus plus all its descendants, though others, such as Paul Sereno, used a more inclusive definition, such as all dinosaurs closer to Shuvuuia than to modern birds. In 2009, Livezey and Zusi used the name Alvarezsauroidea for the total group of all alvarezsaurs, restricting the name Alvarezsauridae to the clade defined by Alvarezsaurus + Mononykus. This was followed by Choiniere and colleagues in 2010, who described the first non-alvarezsaurid alvarezsauroid, Haplocheirus. Some authors have used the name Mononykinae for the sub-group of alvarezsaurs including the advanced Mongolian species. However, Choiniere and colleagues argued that Parvicursorinae has priority, since its coordinate name under the ICZN Code, Parvicursoridae, was named earlier. Another subfamily, Patagonykinae, has been named to include the South American Patagonykus and Bonapartenykus, but a few recent studies have placed them just outside Alvarezsauridae, some of which do not even recover them in a single clade, making Patagonykinae turn out to be paraphyletic.

The cladogram presented here follows a 2012 phylogenetic analysis by Agnolin and colleagues.

Cladogram after Xu et al., 2011:

References

External links
 RE: Alvarezsauridae splitting, by Thomas R. Holtz Jr., from the Dinosaur Mailing List.
 The Holy of Holies... Dinosauria II, by Thomas R. Holtz Jr., from the Dinosaur Mailing List (mentions in passing the alvarezsaurid Rapator hypothesis seeing print for the first time; it had been rumored on the list for several years prior)

 
Santonian first appearances
Prehistoric dinosaur families